John Wang Ruowang (born 1962) is a Chinese Catholic priest and Bishop of the Roman Catholic Diocese of Qinzhou since 2011.

Biography
Wang was born in China in 1962, to a devout Catholic family.

Like many other priests, he experienced a long period of study, after which he was ordained a priest. The Roman Catholic Diocese of Qinzhou left the court in July 2003 after the death of the bishop Casimir Wang Mi-lu. The Holy See assigned priest John Wang Ruowang as Bishop. He accepted the episcopacy with the papal mandate on August 19, 2011.

References

1962 births
Living people
21st-century Roman Catholic bishops in China